Chipingomyia manica is a species of tephritid or fruit flies in the genus Chipingomyia of the family Tephritidae.

Distribution
Tanzania, Zimbabwe.

References

Tephritinae
Diptera of Africa
Insects described in 1986